Colleen Darnell (Manassa; born 1980) is an American Egyptologist. Her areas of expertise include Late Period uses of the Underworld Books, ancient Egyptian military history, the literature of New Kingdom Egypt, and Egyptian revival history.
   
Her research in Egyptian military history has led to the first recreation of the tactics of the Battle of Perire, c. 1208 BCE and one source says that her study The Great Karnak Inscription of Merneptah "replaces all other earlier studies of the key historical narratives relating Merneptah's war against the Libyans." Her research on the military role that Tutankhamun might have taken on as pharaoh of Egypt contributed to Tutankhamun's Armies: Battle and Conquest in Ancient Egypt's Late Eighteenth Dynasty (co-authored with John Coleman Darnell) and was featured in the historical section of the documentary "King Tut Unwrapped."

In Egypt, she has made several important archaeological discoveries as the director of the Moalla Survey Project, an ongoing archaeological project.

Biography
Colleen Manassa studied for her undergraduate and postgraduate degrees at Yale, gaining her B.A. in 2001 and Ph.D. 2005. In 2006 she joined the faculty as an assistant professor and director of undergraduate studies. She was promoted to associate professor in 2010.

In January 2013, a scandal broke that Colleen Manassa and fellow professor John Darnell had been carrying out a long-running affair. Within the small Near Eastern Languages and Civilizations (NELC) department, they were the only two faculty members in the even-smaller Egyptology program. "Four individuals with close ties to the department" claimed the relationship was common knowledge within the department, and Assyriology professor Benjamin Foster reported "the basic situation has been known for a very long time." In divorce documents filed by Darnell's wife Deborah Darnell on Nov 5, 2012, she asserted that the affair began in 2000 when Manassa was an undergraduate student under Darnell's direct supervision. On January 8, 2013, John Darnell admitted to the affair with his student and accepted a one-year suspension without pay. Darnell also admitted to "participating in the review" of Manassa's hiring and attempting to cover up his multiple policy violations.

In August of 2013 the university prohibited Darnell from holding an administrative position until 2023, and Manassa until 2018.

Eventually John was invited back to teach, but Colleen left Yale in 2015.

She now teaches art history at the University of Hartford. She was listed as visiting professor there as early as 2015.

Now married, John and Colleen live in Durham, Connecticut.

Egyptology

Archaeological work 
In 2008, Darnell created the Moalla Survey Project, an archaeological survey expedition in Egypt (under the auspices of the Egyptian Ministry of State for Antiquities) that has discovered several important new sites on the east bank of the Nile approximately 45 south of Luxor, ranging in date from the late Predynastic period through the late Roman period. In 2010, she discovered an extensive late Roman settlement with over a hundred distinct structures. Within the necropolis of Moalla, the Moalla Survey Project also discovered a Nubian Pan Grave cemetery (ca. 1600 BCE). In 2010, Darnell presented the first identification of Nubian (Pan Grave) pottery manufactured at the site of Umm Mawagir in Kharga Oasis.

Museum work 
As curator of "Echoes of Egypt: Conjuring the Land of the Pharaohs," Darnell assembled nearly one hundred objects ranging from ancient Egyptian objects to pieces that span two millennia of fascination with ancient Egypt. Critics have described the exhibition as “an ambitious... landmark exhibition”  with “careful curation." The exhibition is accompanied by print catalog and online catalogs,  and includes a driving tour of Connecticut Egyptian revival buildings.

Vintage fashion 
Darnell, as well as her husband, are known for their choice of clothes, remarked upon as early as 2007. She has been interviewed by Racked, the historical fashion podcast Dressed: The History of Fashion, and Egypt Today.

In 2017, Darnell launched an Instagram account with the username 'Vintage Egyptologist'. With few Egyptian workers appearing in the pictures, the account was included in a critique by fellow Egyptologists of 'scholars who know these problematic histories choose to engage in the aesthetics of colonialism.'

Books
 

 

 

 

 
 Winner of the Samuel and Ronnie Heyman Prize for Outstanding Scholarly Publication, 2008.

 

 
 Winner of the Samuel and Ronnie Heyman Prize for Outstanding Scholarly Publication, 2008

References 

1980 births
Living people
American Egyptologists
21st-century American archaeologists
American women archaeologists
American art historians
Women art historians
Yale University alumni
Yale University faculty
American women academics
21st-century American women
21st-century American academics
Historians from Missouri
People from St. Louis
Instagram accounts